Spineda is a comune (municipality) in the Province of Cremona in the Italian region Lombardy, located about  southeast of Milan and about  east of Cremona.

Spineda borders the following municipalities: Commessaggio, Gazzuolo, Rivarolo del Re ed Uniti, Rivarolo Mantovano, Sabbioneta, San Martino dall'Argine.

Demographic evolution

References

External links
 Official website

Cities and towns in Lombardy